is an automobile parts manufacturer that once existed in Japan. After the acquisition and merger by Hitachi, it is now the Hitachi Astemo brand. It is one of many companies originating from Tokyo Gas Electric Engineering Company.

Tokico Techno, an affiliated company, manufactured and sold measuring instruments for gas stations, fillers for eco-stations, and dispensers, but changed its name to Hitachi Automotive Systems Measurement in 2015. After that, on February 1, 2019, the shares of Hitachi Automotive Systems Measurement were transferred to the investment fund Polaris Capital Group, and the trade name was changed to Tokico System Solutions on September 1.

References

External links
Tokico System Solutions website

Auto parts suppliers of Japan
Japanese brands
Manufacturing companies established in 1937
Japanese companies established in 1937